Rudolf Markgraf (born November 5, 1860) was an architect in the United States. Two buildings he designed are listed in the National Register of Historic Places and a third is a National Landmark.

He was born and educated in Germany. He married and had three daughters.

Work
Dr. Generous Henderson House at 1016 The Paseo in Kansas City, Missouri, listed on the National Register of Historic Places
Mutual Ice Company Building at 4142-4144 Pennsylvania Avenue in Kansas City (MO), listed on the National Register of Historic Places
Mutual Musicians' Foundation Building at 1823 Highland Avenue in Kansas City, a National Landmark

References

Place of birth missing
19th-century German architects
Date of death missing
Place of death missing
German emigrants to the United States
1860 births